Laura is a rural town in the Mid North region of South Australia, 12 km north of Gladstone on the Horrocks Highway and 40 km east of Port Pirie. The first European to explore the district was Thomas Burr in September 1842. His promising reports soon led to occupation of the district by pastoralists, one of whom was Herbert Bristow Hughes (c. 1821 – 18 May 1892). When the present town was surveyed he named it for his wife, Laura née White (c. 1829 – 5 January 1909).

Laura is administered by the Northern Areas Council, and is in the state electoral district of Stuart and the federal Division of Grey. It was formerly the council seat of the Corporate Town of Laura (1882–1932) and the District Council of Laura (1932–1988), as well as the District Council of Booyoolie (1876–1932), which covered the area surrounding the township.

The Laura Community Development and Tourism Association Incorporated liaises with the Northern Areas Council in preserving the amenity of the rural centre, with the support of many volunteers in community projects. The LCDTA's major project is operating the community-owned Laura Caravan Park. Profits from the caravan park operations are then used for improvements in the township.

The Spiny Daisy (Acanthocladium dockeri) was rediscovered in 1999 near Laura. The species, which was last seen in the South Australian Riverland in 1910, was found along a roadside.

Attractions

Current 
The Laura Folk Fair is a two-day event held in April every year. There is no admission fee which makes the Folk Fair a family friendly outing. The Laura Country Music Festival has been held annually in July since 2011.

Laura is famous as the home of Golden North ice cream which has been manufactured in the town since 1923 (the factory being the biggest employer in the district)

Former 
The Wilmington railway line was built from Gladstone railway station to Laura in 1884. It was extended from Laura in 1910 to Booleroo Centre, and finally to Wilmington in 1915. It closed in 1969.

The historic former Laura Courthouse in Hughes Street is listed on the South Australian Heritage Register.

Media
Between 1889 and 1948, Laura had its own newspaper, the Standard. Its first iteration, Laura Standard (subtitled: and Beetaloo, Wirrabara, Melrose, Booleroo Centre and Yarrowie Advertiser) ran from 1889. In 1917 it merged with Crystal Brook Times to form Laura Standard and Crystal Brook Courier. In 1948, this newspaper then merged with Areas' Express and Agriculturist and Review to form Northern Review (later becoming The Flinders News).

Notable residents

 C. J. Dennis (1876–1938), poet and writer
 Gordon Jackett (1887–1951), politician
 Brenton Miels (1948–1997), Australian Rules footballer

References

Towns in South Australia
Mid North (South Australia)